Ålvundeidet is a village in Sunndal Municipality in Møre og Romsdal county, Norway.  The village is located at the western end of the Innerdalen valley on an isthmus between two fjords: Ålvundfjorden and Sunndalsfjorden.  The village area is located along the Norwegian National Road 70, about halfway between the villages of Ålvund and Sunndalsøra.

The village was the administrative centre of the old municipality of Ålvundeid which existed from 1899 until 1960 when it was merged into Sunndal Municipality. The village is home to Ålvundeid Church which serves all of the Ålvundeid parish in northern Sunndal.

See also
Other neighboring villages in Sunndal municipality: Gjøra, Grøa, Hoelsand, Jordalsgrenda, Romfo, Ålvund, and Øksendalsøra.

References

Villages in Møre og Romsdal
Sunndal